Antonio Santillán (1909 in Madrid – 1966 in Barcelona) was a Spanish film director and screenwriter. He directed films such as 
Enemigos (1942), La noche del martes (1944), Sucedió en mi aldea (1956), Cuatro en la frontera (1958) and Trampa mortal (1963).

Filmography

As director
Enemigos (1942)
La noche del martes (1944)
Almas en peligro (1952)
El presidio (1954)
El ojo de cristal (1956)
Sucedió en mi aldea (1956)
Hospital of Urgency (1956)
Cuatro en la frontera (1958)
Cita imposible (1958)
Los desesperados (1960)
Senda torcida (1962)
Trampa mortal (1963)

As screenwriter
Almas en peligro (1952)
Sucedió en mi aldea (1956)
Hospital of Urgency (1956)
Los desesperados (1960)
Ruthless Colt of the Gringo (1966)

References

1909 births
1966 deaths
Film directors from Madrid